The guitarfish, also referred to as shovelnose rays, are a family, Rhinobatidae, of rays. The guitarfish are known for an elongated body with a flattened head and trunk and small, ray-like wings. The combined range of the various species is tropical, subtropical, and warm temperate waters worldwide.

Names
In Australia and New Zealand, guitarfish are commonly referred to as shovelnose rays or shovelnose sharks.

Description
Guitarfish have a body form intermediate between those of sharks and rays. The tail has a typical shark-like form, but in many species, the head has a triangular, or guitar-like shape, rather than the disc-shape formed by fusion with the pectoral fins found in other rays.

Reproduction
Guitarfish are ovoviviparous; the embryo matures inside an egg within the mother until it is ready to hatch. This is typical of rays.

Habitat
Guitarfish are bottom feeders that bury themselves in mud or sand and eat worms, crabs, and clams. Some can tolerate salt, fresh, and brackish water. They generally live close to the beach/coastline or in estuaries.

Evolution
Rays, including guitarfish, belong to the ancient lineage of cartilaginous fishes. Fossil denticles (tooth-like scales in the skin) resembling that of today's chondrichthyans date at least as far back as the Ordovician, with the oldest unambiguous fossils of cartilaginous fish dating from the middle Devonian. A clade within this diverse family, the Neoselachii, emerged by the Triassic, with the best-understood neoselachian fossils dating from the Jurassic. This clade is represented today by sharks, sawfish, rays and skates.

Classification
Nelson's 2006 Fishes of the World recognized four genera in this family: Aptychotrema, Rhinobatos, Trygonorrhina, and Zapteryx; other taxa once placed in the Rhinobatidae, such as Platyrhinoidis and Rhina, have since been moved to their own families. Recently, the genus Glaucostegus has again become recognized as distinct from Rhinobatos.

Rhinobatos has been split in three genera based on genetic and morphological considerations: Rhinobatos, Acroteriobatus and Pseudobatos. Tarsistes is dubious and may be a synonym of Pseudobatos, and other genera formerly included in Rhinobatidae have been moved to Glaucostegidae, Rhinidae and Trygonorrhinidae.

A 2021 re-evaluation of almost complete and articulated material from the Konservat-Lagerstätten of Bolca in Italy suggested that †"Rhinobatos" dezignii and †"Rhinobatos" primaevus should be excluded from Rhinobatos and assigned to the new genera †Pseudorhinobatos and †Eorhinobatos, respectively.

 Genus Acroteriobatus Giltay, 1928
 Acroteriobatus andysabini (2021) (Malagasy blue-spotted guitarfish)
 Acroteriobatus annulatus (J. P. Müller & Henle, 1841) (Lesser guitarfish)
 Acroteriobatus blochii (J. P. Müller & Henle, 1841) (Bluntnose guitarfish)
 Acroteriobatus leucospilus (Norman, 1926) (Grayspotted guitarfish)
 Acroteriobatus ocellatus (Norman, 1926) (Speckled guitarfish)
 Acroteriobatus omanensis Last, Hendeson & Naylor, 2016 (Oman guitarfish)
 Acroteriobatus salalah (J. E. Randall & Compagno, 1995) (Salalah guitarfish)
 Acroteriobatus stehmanni (2021) (Socotra blue-spotted guitarfish)
 Acroteriobatus variegatus (Nair & Lal Mohan, 1973) (Stripenose guitarfish)
 Acroteriobatus zanzibarensis (Norman, 1926) (Zanzibar guitarfish)
 Genus †Eorhinobatos Marramà et al., 2021
 †Eorhinobatos primaevus (De Zigno, 1874)
 Genus Pseudobatos Last, Seret, and Naylor, 2016
 Pseudobatos buthi K.M. Rutledge, 2019 (Spadenose guitarfish)
 Pseudobatos glaucostigmus (D. S. Jordan & C. H. Gilbert, 1883) (Speckled guitarfish)
 Pseudobatos horkelii (J. P. Müller & Henle, 1841) (Brazilian guitarfish)
 Pseudobatos lentiginosus (Garman, 1880) (Atlantic guitarfish)
 Pseudobatos leucorhynchus (Günther, 1867) (Whitesnout guitarfish)
 Pseudobatos percellens (Walbaum, 1792) (Chola guitarfish)
 Pseudobatos planiceps (Garman, 1880) (Pacific guitarfish)
 Pseudobatos prahli (Acero P & Franke, 1995) (Gorgona guitarfish)
 Pseudobatos productus (Ayres, 1854) (Shovelnose guitarfish) Marramà 
 Genus †Pseudorhinobatos Marramà et al., 2021
 †Pseudorhinobatos dezignii (Heckel, 1853)
 Genus Rhinobatos H. F. Linck, 1790
 Rhinobatos albomaculatus Norman, 1930 (white-spotted guitarfish)
 Rhinobatos annandalei Norman, 1926 (Annandale's guitarfish)
 Rhinobatos borneensis Last, Séret & Naylor, 2016 (Borneo guitarfish)
 Rhinobatos holcorhynchus Norman, 1922 (slender guitarfish)
 Rhinobatos hynnicephalus J. Richardson, 1846 (Ringstreaked guitarfish)
 Rhinobatos irvinei Norman, 1931 (spineback guitarfish)
 Rhinobatos jimbaranensis Last, W. T. White & Fahmi, 2006 (Jimbaran shovelnose ray)
 Rhinobatos lionotus Norman, 1926 (smoothback guitarfish)
 Rhinobatos nudidorsalis Last, Compagno & Nakaya, 2004 (Bareback shovelnose ray)
 Rhinobatos penggali Last, W. T. White & Fahmi, 2006 (Indonesian shovelnose ray)
 Rhinobatos punctifer Compagno & Randall, 1987 (spotted guitarfish)
 Rhinobatos rhinobatos Linnaeus, 1758 (common guitarfish)
 Rhinobatos sainsburyi Last, 2004 (goldeneye shovelnose ray)
 Rhinobatos schlegelii J. P. Müller & Henle, 1841 (brown guitarfish)
 Rhinobatos whitei Last, Corrigan & Naylor, 2014 (Philippine guitarfish)
 Genus †Myledaphus Cope, 1876
 Myledaphus araucanus Otero, 2019
 †Myledaphus bipartitus Cope, 1876

References

.01
Ray families
Rhinopristiformes
Late Jurassic fish
Extant Late Jurassic first appearances
Taxa named by Friedrich Gustav Jakob Henle